Sultanabad is a town in Sultanabad mandal of Peddapalli district in the state of Telangana, India. It was earlier known as Osmannagar.

Geography 

References 

Villages in Peddapalli district